This is a list of folk metal bands. The genre of folk metal is a fusion of heavy metal music with folk music. This includes the widespread use of folk instruments and to a lesser extent traditional singing styles.

The music of folk metal is characterised by its diversity with bands known to perform different styles of both heavy metal music and folk music. Bands are identified in the list below.

List of bands

See also 
List of Viking metal bands
List of heavy metal bands
Heavy metal subgenres

References

External links 

List of folk metal bands on About.com
List of folk metal bands on Musicmight

 
Folk metal